is a vertical scrolling shooter developed for the arcades by UPL and released in 1989. While similar to most other scrolling shooters, Omega Fighter was unique in its gameplay, level and enemy focus: rather than flying over multiple levels, the player faced up against an enormous space battle cruiser which contained every level. A Sega Genesis version was planned but never released.

Gameplay
Taking place in the future, an enormous alien battle cruiser/space craft carrier has attacked the Earth. The Earth's only defense lies in small fighter craft wielding great firepower with the mission of dismantling the cruiser one portion at a time before it lands.

Players were briefed before every mission to destroy specific parts of the enormous ship. Destroying these parts of the ship would actually play some significance on the game's ending, but overall contributed to the player's score. The game has a unique scoring aspect that awarded the player for destroying enemies at point blank range.

There are two weapons that the player picks up, and if the player picks up a different powerup, it will always reset to its lowest level:
 (I) - Ion Laser: Shoots straight, pick up more to increase damage at a cost of decreasing length. Ideal for close combat.
 (W) - Wide Shot: Shoots bullets in wider range when collecting more of them. Ideal for taking enemies from afar but deals less damage.

There are also two items that are pressed by the 'bomb' button, and each player may pick up to two of them:
 Silver - Activate to slow down everything on screen. Useful to dodge bullets and getting closer for higher score.
 Gold - Destroy all enemies on screen, score depends on closeness to player prior to using the item.

Reception
In Japan, Game Machine listed Omega Fighter on their August 15, 1989 issue as being the fifteenth most popular table arcade unit at the time.

At the time of the game's release, Computer + Video Games and Advanced Computer Entertainment generally found the game playable and fulfilling. Your Sinclair, on the other hand, felt the gameplay and graphics were uninspired.

See also
 Task Force Harrier

Notes

References

 solvalou.com Magazine articles at Solvalou.com

External links

Omega Fighter at arcade-history.com

1989 video games
Arcade video games
Arcade-only video games
Nintendo Switch games
PlayStation 4 games
Cancelled Sega Genesis games
Vertically scrolling shooters
UPL Co., Ltd games
Video games developed in Japan
Hamster Corporation games